West Virginia Route 9 (WV 9) is a major east–west state highway located in the eastern extents of West Virginia's Eastern Panhandle. The western terminus of the route is at the Maryland state line north of Paw Paw, where WV 9 becomes Maryland Route 51 (MD 51) upon crossing the Potomac River. The eastern terminus is at the Virginia state line at Keyes Gap near Mannings, West Virginia, where WV 9 continues onward as Virginia State Route 9 (SR 9).

With no east–west US Highway in the region, WV 9 acts as the major east–west transportation artery between Morgan, Berkeley, and Jefferson counties. WV 9 briefly enters Hampshire County where it intersects with WV 29 near Pin Oak.

History

Construction

WV 9 recently underwent a major upgrade.

U.S. Senator Robert C. Byrd began securing funding for the projects in the early 1990s. Shortly thereafter, a short portion of the road along the southern edge of Martinsburg was upgraded to four lanes, from Queen Street to Kelly Island Road. In the mid-2000s, a short stretch was also upgraded to four lanes from Interstate 81 (I-81) west to Harlan Springs Road.

The next significant improvement did not take place until September 2007, when a  stretch of the upgraded road opened up from Charles Town, through Bardane to Leetown Road in Kearneysville.

In early 2008, the future west-bound lanes of traffic were opened to two-way traffic from Kelly Island Road to, and over, Opequon Creek. This allowed for the former road surface to be pulled up and the eastbound lanes to be built. It also allowed for the demolition of the old bridge over the Opequon, which had been the site of several fatal accidents.

In April 2009, a short  section of the new WV 9 was opened from the Eastern Regional Jail to the Opequon Creek bridge. A  section of WV 9 from the Eastern Regional Jail to Short Road was completed at the end of 2009. Construction from Short Road to Leetown Road was completed in August 2010.

The stretch from the Virginia line to Charles Town was the most recent stage of construction. A pair of new bridges span U.S. Route 340 (US 340) south of Charles Town. The bypass carries WV 9 away from its previous winding route across the Shenandoah River and the Blue Ridge. Instead, it follows a straight path near Cattail Run Road, connecting with Virginia Route 9 at Keyes Gap.

Despite opposition from some Virginia residents, who were concerned about increasing traffic along the narrow, winding stretch of SR 9 through the town of Hillsboro, this stretch of road opened to traffic on November 14, 2012.

Naming dedication
In April 2008, a section of the road, which passes by his Gap View Farm home, was named and dedicated in Frank Buckles's honor by then-West Virginia Governor Joe Manchin.

Major intersections

See also

References

External links

WVDOT WV Route 9

009
West Virginia Route 009
West Virginia Route 009
West Virginia Route 009
West Virginia Route 009